The 1910 Michigan State Normal Normalites football team represented Michigan State Normal College (later renamed Eastern Michigan University) during the 1910 college football season.  In their first and only season under head coach Curry Hicks, the Normalites compiled a record of 0–5–1 and were outscored by their opponents by a combined total of 68 to 11. Carleton H. Runciman was the team captain. The 11 points scored by the team remains the Eastern Michigan record for fewest points scored in a season.

The team played its home games on a field that is now occupied by McKenny Union and a second field located on the campus mall between the Briggs Building and the Strong Building.

Schedule

Players
The following 12 individuals received varsity letters for their participation on the 1910 Michigan State Normal football team.

 Glenn H. Avery, quarterback
 William H. Buhl, guard
 Guy A. Durgan, fullback/halfback/tackle
 Homer H. Hunt, halfback/quarterback
 Floyd D. Johnson, center/halfback
 John E. Monks, tackle/fullback/halfback
 Earl T. Oakes, guard
 Floyd D. Pierce, center/tackle
 Carleton H. Runciman, end, tackle, and team captain
 Ray W. Scalf, center
 John T. Symons, quarterback
 Vanderveer, fullback

Other players included the following:

 John B. Alford
 Anderson, tackle
 George P. Becker, end
 Bradshaw, end
 John C. Cole
 Leonard L. D'ooge, fullback/halfback
 Exelby, halfback
 Mayer, fullback
 W. Calvin McKean
 Edward P. Mears, guard
 Edgar H. Mumford
 Shirley L. Owens
 Leigh H. Simpson
 Wallace L. Van Alstine
 Earl J. Welch/Welsh, guard

References

Michigan State Normal
Eastern Michigan Eagles football seasons
College football winless seasons
Michigan State Normal Normalites football